Frederick II (17 January 1379 – 13 or 20 June 1454) was a Count of Celje and Ban of Croatia, Slavonia and Dalmatia.

Early life
Frederick was the son of Hermann II, Count of Celje and his wife Anna of Schaunberg.

Marriages
Frederick II married Elizabeth of Frankopan and after her death in 1422, Veronika of Desenice. The famous Eberhard Windbeck chronicle gives a detailed report on the circumstances of Elizabeth of Frankopan's death, which in the chronicle is described as murder and placed in the year 1424.

Ancestry

Family tree

See also 

 Counts of Celje
 Skrad castle

References

1379 births
1454 deaths
Counts of Celje
Bans of Croatia